is a private university in Takasaki, Gunma, Japan, established in 2001. The predecessor of the school was founded in 1936.

International partnership
  College of Health Sciences Ahmad Yani Yogyakarta,

External links
 Official website

References

Educational institutions established in 1936
Private universities and colleges in Japan
Universities and colleges in Gunma Prefecture
Takasaki, Gunma
1936 establishments in Japan